The Son of Amir Is Dead is a 1975 Belgian film directed by Jean-Jacques Andrien. It won the Golden Leopard at the 1975 Locarno International Film Festival.

Reception
The film won the Golden Leopard at the 1975 Locarno International Film Festival. It received the André Cavens Award for Best Film given by the Belgian Film Critics Association (UCC).

References

External links

1975 films
Belgian drama films
Films directed by Jean-Jacques Andrien
Golden Leopard winners